Nick Itkin (born October 9, 1999) is an American right-handed foil fencer, two-time NCAA champion, 2022 team Pan American champion, and 2021 team Olympic bronze medalist. He won a bronze medal in individual men's foil at the 2022 senior World Fencing Championships in Cairo, Egypt.

Early life 
Itkin was born in Pacific Palisades, California, grew up in Los Angeles, and is Jewish. His parents are Michael ("Misha"; a fencing coach) and Tatiana (a former rhythmic gymnast, and current coach). His older sister Julia competed in rhythmic gymnastics for the US national team. He attended Palisades High School, graduating in 2017.

Fencing career

2015-19; Junior World Champion
Itkin trains under his father at Los Angeles International Fencing Center, which his father founded in 2003. In 2015, he was a Cadet Junior Olympics bronze medalist, and in 2016 he was a Cadet Pan American Championships gold medalist. In 2017 he was a Junior Pan American Championships silver medalist.

At the 2018 Junior World Fencing Championships in Verona, Italy, Itkin won the gold medal in foil. He defeated future world silver medalist Tommaso Marini of Italy in the final. He also won a team bronze medal at the championships. When he then also won consecutive NCAA Fencing Championships in foil, in 2018 and 2019 as he fenced for the University of Notre Dame where he studied political science, he decided to pursue fencing at the senior level. In 2018 he became the first American fencer to win gold medals at all three of the NCAA Fencing Championships, the US National Fencing championships, and the Junior World Fencing Championship in the same year. In 2019 he also won a team gold medal at the 2019 Pan American Fencing Championships in Toronto, Canada.

2020-present; Olympic bronze medalist, and World Championship bronze medalist
Itkin won the gold medal at a 2020 World Cup in Paris, becoming the youngest top-10 foil fencer in the world. Among other victories, in the competition he defeated the reigning world champion and world # 3 Enzo Lefort of France, and the reigning Olympic champion Daniele Garozzo of Italy.

In 2021, Itkin won the US National Championship in foil, in Philadelphia.

At the 2021 Olympic Games in Tokyo, at 21 years of age, Itkin won a bronze medal with Team USA in the men's team foil competition. He came in 12th in the individual men's foil competition at the Olympics. At the 2022 Pan American Fencing Championships in Asunción, Paraguay, he won a team gold medal, and an individual bronze medal.

Itkin won an individual bronze medal in men's foil at the 2022 World Fencing Championships in Cairo, Egypt. In the competition, he defeated among others world # 6 Takahiro Shikine of Japan and former world champion and current world # 3 Alessio Foconi of Italy, before losing to the reigning world champion Enzo Lefort of France by a score of 15–14.

Medal record

Olympic Games

World Championship

Pan American Championship

Grand Prix

World Cup

See also
List of select Jewish fencers

References

External links
THE-sports page
Twitter page

Living people
American male foil fencers
Jewish male foil fencers
Jewish American sportspeople
Olympic bronze medalists for the United States in fencing
Fencers at the 2020 Summer Olympics
Medalists at the 2020 Summer Olympics
People from Pacific Palisades, California
1999 births
Notre Dame Fighting Irish fencers
Olympic fencers of the United States
Pan American Games medalists in fencing
Sportspeople from Los Angeles
World Cadets and Juniors Fencing Championships medalists
World Fencing Championships medalists
Pan American Games gold medalists for the United States
Fencers at the 2019 Pan American Games
Medalists at the 2019 Pan American Games